Vernice "Flygirl" Armour (born 1973) is a former United States Marine Corps officer who was the first African-American female naval aviator in the Marine Corps and the Marine Corps first female combat aviator.  She flew the AH-1W SuperCobra attack helicopter in the 2003 invasion of Iraq and eventually served two tours in support of Operation Iraqi Freedom.

Early life and education
Armour was born in 1973 in Chicago, Illinois to Gaston Armour Jr. and Authurine Armour. After her parents divorced, Clarence Jackson married Authurine. Both her father and her stepfather had served in the military - Gaston Armour was a retired major in the U.S. Army Reserve, and Clarence Jackson was a former Marine Corps sergeant that served three tours in Vietnam. 
Her grandfather was a Montford Point Marine, the first African Americans to integrate the Marine Corps between 1942 and 1949.

Raised in Memphis, Tennessee, Armour graduated from Overton High School, where she was a member of the mathematics honor society, the National Honor Society, and class vice-president.

Career

In 1993, while a student at Middle Tennessee State University (MTSU), Armour enlisted in the U.S. Army Reserve and later entered into the U.S. Army's ROTC.

In 1996, she took time off from college to become a Nashville police officer (her childhood dream). She became the first female African-American on the motorcycle squad.

Armour graduated from MTSU in 1997. In 1998, Armour became the first African American female to serve as a police officer in Tempe, Arizona before joining the U.S. Marines as an Officer Candidate in October 1998.

Commissioned a second lieutenant on December 12, 1998 Armour was sent to flight school at Naval Air Station Corpus Christi, Texas and later Naval Air Station Pensacola, Florida. Earning her wings in July 2001, Armour was not only number one in her class of twelve, she was number one among the last two hundred graduates. She became the Marine Corps' first African-American female pilot.

After flight school, Armour was assigned to Marine Corps Base Camp Pendleton near San Diego, California for training in the AH-1W SuperCobra. While at Camp Pendleton, she was named 2001 Camp Pendleton Female Athlete of the Year, twice won the Camp's annual Strongest Warrior Competition, and was a running back for the San Diego Sunfire women's football team.

In March 2003, she flew with HMLA-169 during the invasion of Iraq becoming the Marines first black female combat pilot. She completed two combat tours in the Gulf. Afterwards, she was assigned to the Manpower and Reserve Affairs Equal Opportunity Branch as program liaison officer.

Armour's association with the SuperCobra attack helicopter earned her the nickname "Flygirl."

Personal life
Leaving the U.S. Marine Corps in June 2007, Armour began a career as a professional speaker and expert on creating breakthroughs in life.

In 2011, her book Zero to Breakthrough: The 7-Step, Battle-Tested Method for Accomplishing Goals that Matter was published.

Awards and decorations

Further reading
Armour, Vernice.  Zero to Breakthrough: The 7-Step, Battle-Tested Method for Accomplishing Goals that Matter.   Gotham, 2011.

See also

List of United States Marines
List of African-American firsts

References

External links

Vernice Armour's interview on CNN

1973 births
Living people
African-American female military personnel
United States Marine Corps officers
United States Naval Aviators
Women United States Naval Aviators
Helicopter pilots
United States Marine Corps personnel of the Iraq War
Women in the Iraq War
Female United States Marine Corps personnel
Middle Tennessee State University alumni
People from Chicago
People from Memphis, Tennessee
Recipients of the Air Medal
American police officers
African-American writers
21st-century American women writers
21st-century American writers
American women aviators
African-American aviators
Aviators from Illinois
African-American women aviators